Masterman (1899–1911) was an American Thoroughbred racehorse that was the winner of the 1902 Belmont Stakes.

At the 1903 dispersal sale of Belmont's stable, Masterman was purchased by John Boden for $2,500. Masterman was later given to the Canadian Breeding Bureau by Boden in September 1908 for use as a sire for cavalry horses. Masterman was euthanized in June 1911 after breaking a leg at a contract farm in Petite Cote, Quebec where he was being stabled.

References

1899 racehorse births
1911 racehorse deaths
Belmont Stakes winners
Racehorses bred in the United States
Racehorses trained in the United States
Thoroughbred family 4-r
Godolphin Arabian sire line